Pedro Páramo is a 1967 Mexican drama film directed by Carlos Velo. It was entered into the 1967 Cannes Film Festival. It is based on the short novel of the same name.

Cast
 John Gavin as Pedro Páramo
 Ignacio López Tarso as Fulgor Sedano
 Pilar Pellicer as Susana San Juan
 Carlos Fernández as Juan Preciado
 Julissa as Ana Rentería
 Graciela Doring as Damiana Cisneros
 Augusto Benedico as Padre Rentería
 Beatriz Sheridan as Eduviges Diada
 Claudia Millán as Dolores Preciado
 Rosa Furman as Dorotea la Cuarraca
 Joaquín Martínez as Abundio Martínez
 Jorge Russek as El Tilcuate
 Eric del Castillo as Perseverancio
 Amparo Villegas as Madre Villa
 Graciela Lara
 Alfonso Arau as Saltaperico

Production
John Gavin was best known for appearing in films produced by Ross Hunter. He had a Mexican mother and said he made this film "so I could make something I was proud of". He was first asked to make the film by Fuentes in 1962. Gavin:
In Mexico, Pedro Páramo is as important as Don Quixote is in Spain. This may sound grandiose but it can be compared with Dante's Divine Inferno or Goethe's Faust. It is the journey of a young man in search of his father but, as an allegory, it is man in search of himself... It's the biggest Mexican film ever made.

Release
The film was released in the US in 1967.

References

External links

1967 films
1967 drama films
Mexican drama films
Mexican black-and-white films
1960s Spanish-language films
Films set in the 1900s
Films directed by Carlos Velo
Films scored by Ennio Morricone
1960s Mexican films